Koen van den Broek (born 1973) is a Belgian artist who lives and works in Antwerp and Seoul, South Korea.

Biography
Van den Broek was born in 1973 in Bree, Belgium.

He trained as an architect at the Katholieke Universiteit Leuven. At the Academy, Koen was tutored and taught by Fred Bervoets. In 2003 he participated in the SFMOMA- exhibition "Matisse and beyond: A century of modernism" in honor of his mentor.

Van den Broek was acquainted with John Baldessari when he went to Los Angeles, not long after his stay at the post-graduate program of the HISK (Higher Institute for Fine Arts) in Antwerp in 2001. They decided in 2008 to collaborate on a project that combined photographs by Baldessari with painted interventions by van den Broek. "I worked with photographs Baldessari made of film-stills of Hollywood-movies (…) Baldessari printed them on large format, three by four metres (…) John sent me images that are the opposite of my work: black and white, lots of interiors, while I work with colour and exteriors. (…) he sets up pitfalls for an artist, because I definitely didn't want to do what he should do: it was a tricky process, but also a very intriguing one."

When he was asked by the Museum of Modern Art, Antwerp in 2008 to curate an exhibition with their collection, he combined it with work from Belgian private collections. He created connections between Minimalist and Post-expressionist art styles.

On the occasion of his solo-exhibitions at the Municipal Museum for Contemporary Art (Stedelijk Museum voor Actuele Kunst, SMAK) in Ghent, "Crack", a comprehensive catalogue, was published, edited by Wouter Davidts, and with contributions by, among others John Welchman, Andrew Renton and Dirk Lauwaert. In this monography, as well as in the exhibition a broad overview was given of van den Broek's career until then, and this helped him to draw "…new conclusions from my older work and this gave me the energy to keep on developing my familiar motives of the urban landscape and how this can be translated in new ways onto the canvas."

Work
The work of van den Broek is characterized thematically by the way in which it treats the (mainly American and Asian) landscape, starting more and more from an abstract language.

Van den Broek is mainly concerned with the image and the structure of the image itself, much less with the handling of paint or bringing over a message.

In "The blinding of photography" Dirk Lauwaert points out that: "… in every image, the painter [van den Broek] marks out his place with razor-sharp precision". The reason is his photographic point of departure, the world as seen through one lens. Van den Broek's main question here is: how to translate the photographic eye into an image. "The photograph is in fact less than a sketch. It is something that is wholly and completely inadequate: it is not an image, at best only a registration. It is not a material that can be worked –such as a drawing that is homologous to a painting. The photograph must disappear as a photograph in order for an image to exist."

This use of photography has consequences for the composition. In contrast to human interpretation, which tries to structure what is important and what is not, the mechanical device blurs this difference. By his cadrage he always seems to leave out the most important part.

Therefore, his paintings often show seemingly unimportant details or object-matter like kerb-stones, garages, shadows or cracks in a road-surface. Their subject however, according to David Anfam, seems to be something else:  "… the hoary modernist process of abstracting from observation has gone awry. … these fields and angles are semaphores, as non-objective as Newman's or Piet Mondrian's, in search of a subject. Here schemata seek or feign to become site-specific places."

Van den Broek often uses saturated and high-key colours. In his work, space is made by its borders and demarcations, and light is evoked with shadow, without midtones. This lends to his work often a graphic character, with pure colours.

Recently, in a series of new exhibitions (Chicane at Marlborough Contemporary London, Yaw at Galerie Greta Meert Brussels, Apex at Friedman Benda Gallery New York, Zylon at Gallery Baton in Seoul, Armco at Figge von Rosen Galerie in Cologne and Cut Away The Snoopy at Marlborough Contemporary in London) this graphic character has been carried further, into a direction that seems to move away from its basis in reality. To do this, Van den Broek samples parts of existing images freely into a new image. More and more attention is given now to the picture-plane itself, on which architectural details and shadows become pictorial elements that create new constellations.

Exhibitions (selection)
2021: "In Between Memory and Dream", Gallery Baton, Seoul, South-Korea
2020: "The Beginning", Galerie Ron Mandos, Amsterdam, Netherlands
2019: "Wall Works", CCM De Garage, Mechelen, Belgium
2019: "Keep it Together", Galerie Greta Meert, Brussels, Belgium
2019: "The Dog", Philipp von Rosen Galerie, Cologne, Germany
2018: "A Glowing Day", Gallery Baton, Seoul, South-Korea
2016: "Behind The Camera", Philipp von Rose Galerie, Cologne, Germany
2016: "Borderline", Campaign Opera and Ballet Flanders 2016-2017, Antwerp Tower, Antwerp, Belgium
2016: "The Land of Milk & Money", Museum Weserburg, Bremen, Germany
2016: "The Light We Live In", Albertz Benda, New York, United States of America
2016: "In Dialogue With Jan Cox", Duo exhibition curated by Koen van den Broek, Callewaert Vanlangendonck Gallery, Antwerp, Belgium
2015: "Sign Waves", Gallery Baton, Seoul, South Korea
2015: "The Del", Galerie Greta Meert, Brussel, Belg
2014 "Cut Away The Snoopy", Marlborough Contemporary, London, United Kingdom
2014 "Armco", Figge von Rosen Galerie, Cologne, Germany
2013 "Zylon", Gallery Baton, Seoul, South Korea 
2013 "Yaw", Galerie Greta Meert, Brussels, Belgium
2013 "Apex", Friedman Benda, New York, United States
2012 "Chicane", Marlborough Contemporary, London, United Kingdom
2012 "From The East to the West And Back", Gallery Baton, Seoul, South Korea
2011 "Insomnia and the Greenhouse", Friedman Benda, New York, United States of America
2011 "Comin' Down", Figge von Rosen Galerie, Berlin, Germany
2010 "What?" Greta Meert, Brussels, Belgium
2010 "JOURNEY", Figge von Rosen Galerie, Cologne, Germany
2010 "Curbs & Crack", S.M.A.K., Ghent, Belgium
2010 "Preview, Work on Paper by Koen van den Broek", Royal Museum of Fine Arts Antwerp, Antwerp, Belgium
2009 "Shadows of time" Black Polyurethane on inox, MDD, Deurle, Belgium
2008 "THIS AN EXAMPLE OF THAT", Collaboration with John Baldessari, Greta Meert Gallery, Brussels, Belgium
2008 "THIS AN EXAMPLE OF THAT", Collaboration with John Baldessari, Bonnefantenmuseum, Maastricht, Netherlands
2008 "Out of Space", Figge von Rosen, Cologne, Germany
2008 "Who will lead us?" artbrussels, (winner of the illy Prize), Brussels, Belgium
2007 "Angle", Inside the White Cube, London, United Kingdom
2006 "Dante's View", Figge von Rosen Gallery, Cologne, Germany
2006 "Project St Lucas Ghent", Vlaamse Bouwmeester, Ghent, Belgium
2005 "Paintings from the USA and Japan", Museum Dhondt-Dhaenens, Deurle, Belgium
2004 "Koen van den Broek", Domus Artium, Salamanca, Spain
2004 "Framed: Koen van den Broek – Wim Catrysse", Cultuur Centrum Strombeek, Brussels, Belgium
2003 "Threshold", White Cube, London, United Kingdom
2003 Matisse and Beyond: A Century of Modernism, San Francisco Museum of Modern Art, United States of America
2002 "Koen van den Broek", Chapelle des Pénitents Blancs, Gordes, France
2001 "Borders", White Cube, London, United Kingdom
2001 "Koen van den Broek: Paintings", Museum van het Provinciaal Centrum voor Beeldende Kunst-Begijnhof, Hasselt, Belgium
2000 Cultureel Centrum Hasselt, Belgium
1999 Galerij Art 61, Hever, Belgium
1998 Bernarduscentrum, Antwerp, Belgium
1997 Galerij Hellinga Beetsterzwaag, Netherlands

Public collections
Astrup Fearnley Museum of Modern Art, Oslo 
LACMA, Los Angeles, CA
Museum Dhondt-Dhaenens, Deurle
Leeum, Samsung Museum of Modern Art, Seoul 
San Francisco Museum of Modern Art
SMAK, Gent
M HKA, Antwerpen
Kadist Art Foundation, Paris
Busan Museum of Art, Busan
Staatliche Kunsthalle Karlsruhe, Karlsruhe

Bibliography
Koen van den Broek: Stuff, Wouter Davidts, Frank Albers, ed. Exh. Cat. De Garage Mechelen, MER. Borgerhoff & Lamberigts, 2019, 
BALDESSARI John, VAN DEN BROEK Koen, This an example of that. John Baldessari – Koen van den Broek, bkSM, Strombeek, 2008 
DAVIDTS Wouter (ed.), Crack. Koen van den Broek, Valiz, Amsterdam, 2010 
Friedman Benda (ed.), Koen van den Broek. Insomnia and the greenhouse, Hatje Kantz Verlag, Ostfildern, 2013 
NICOLETTA Giovanna, Shadows, MAG Musea Alto Garda, Arco, 2012 
HIGGIE Jennifer, Koen van den Broek, White Cube, London, 2003 
ROELSTRATE Dieter, Angle, 11 works by Koen van den Broek, White Cube, London, 2007
VAN DEN BROEK Koen, Schilderijen/paintings, De bestendige deputatie van de provincieraad van Limburg, Hasselt, 2001

References

External links
 Official website
 Gallery Baton
 Marlborough Contemporary
 Friedman Benda
 Galerie Greta Meert
 Figge von Rosen Galerie
 Lattice Gallery

1973 births
Living people
Belgian artists
People from Bree, Belgium